Latin Flavors is a Hispanic manufacturer of frozen foods sold throughout the United States, Latin America, and the Caribbean headquartered in unincorporated Miami-Dade County, Florida. The primary product lines are pastries and breads formulated from Cuban, Puerto Rican, Caribbean, and South American flavors and recipes.

Latin Flavors traces its heritage back to Cuba, when in 1921 Valentin Garcia, of Spanish descent, and his brothers started their first bakery.  The Garcia brothers grew steadily, and in 1956 inaugurated a new facility and renamed the bakery La Gran Via in Havana, Cuba. La Gran Via continued to grow very rapidly, establishing a reputation as the best bakery in Cuba until the political differences in 1960 forced the family to abandon the business.

Manufacturing 
Latin Flavors produces a wide variety of pastries including Argentinean empanadas, Cuban pastries, Dominican pastries, Jamaican patties, Puerto Rican pastries, and breads from South America and the Caribbean.

Latin Flavors' distribution is done through independent and national wholesale distributors.  Latin Flavors also does custom manufacturing, currently private-labeling for several large national companies.

Manufacturing at the plant is overseen by U.S. Department of Agriculture and U.S. Food and Drug Administration while adhering to Six Sigma manufacturing practices and methodologies.

Company news 
Latin Flavors recently was selected to support the friendly wager between the senators from Florida and Pennsylvania following the 2008 MLB World Series by providing Cuban pastries

See also
Cuban Cuisine
Dominican Cuisine
Jamaican cuisine
Puerto Rican Cuisine
South American cuisine

References

External links

Caribbean-American cuisine
Caribbean-American culture in Florida
Companies based in Miami-Dade County, Florida
Hispanic and Latino American cuisine
Hispanic and Latino American culture in Florida
Latin American cuisine
Food and drink companies established in 2003
American companies established in 2003
2003 establishments in Florida
Food product brands
Privately held companies based in Florida